Derrick Jonathon Dial (born December 20, 1975) is an American-born former professional basketball player. He played parts of four seasons in the National Basketball Association (NBA).

Dial graduated from Cass Technical High School. He played for Eastern Michigan University before being drafted in the second round as a 52nd overall pick by the NBA's San Antonio Spurs in 1998.  Dial played for the Spurs until 2001 when he moved to the Toronto Raptors for the 2001–02 season and then the Orlando Magic for the 2003–04 season. As of February 2008, he plays in the NBA Development League for Anaheim Arsenal. On November 7, 2008, Dial was selected as the 18th pick in the ninth round of the 2008 NBA D-League Draft by the Tulsa 66ers.

References

External links
NBA.com player profile

1975 births
Living people
African-American basketball players
American expatriate basketball people in Canada
American expatriate basketball people in Greece
American expatriate basketball people in Italy
American men's basketball players
Anaheim Arsenal players
Basketball players from Detroit
Cass Technical High School alumni
Eastern Michigan Eagles men's basketball players
Greek Basket League players
Liga ACB players
Long Beach Jam players
Orlando Magic players
San Antonio Spurs draft picks
San Antonio Spurs players
Shooting guards
Toronto Raptors players
Tulsa 66ers players
21st-century African-American sportspeople
20th-century African-American sportspeople